The Man Behind the Mask is a 1936 British mystery film directed by Michael Powell and starring Hugh Williams, Jane Baxter, Ronald Ward, Maurice Schwartz, George Merritt, Henry Oscar and Peter Gawthorne. A man assaults and switches places with another at a masked ball, and then attempts a major theft – casting suspicion on the original man.

The Man Behind the Mask was produced by Joe Rock, for Joe Rock Productions. It was made at Rock Studios, Elstree.

The Man Behind the Mask was missing from the BFI National Archive, and was one of three Powell films included on the British Film Institute's "75 Most Wanted" list of lost films. It is the last of Powell's "quota quickies".

A print of the American release, titled Behind the Mask, has been found, but it is a cut version of the original UK film.

Cast

References

Bibliography
 Low, Rachael. Filmmaking in 1930s Britain. George Allen & Unwin, 1985.
 Wood, Linda. British Films, 1927-1939. British Film Institute, 1986.

External links
 BFI 75 Most Wanted entry, with extensive notes
 

1930s mystery drama films
British mystery drama films
Films shot at Rock Studios
1930s English-language films
Films based on American novels
Films directed by Michael Powell
Films by Powell and Pressburger
Films set in England
Quota quickies
British black-and-white films
1930s rediscovered films
Rediscovered British films
1930s British films